Sam Thomas Timer (December 22, 1926 – February 10, 2010) was an American football coach.  He served as the head football coach at Allegheny College in Meadville, Pennsylvania, for 14 seasons, from 1970 to 1983, compiling a record of  60–52–3.

Death
Timer died on February 10, 2010, at his home in Pinehurst, North Carolina.

Head coaching record

College

Notes

References

External links
 

1926 births
2010 deaths
Allegheny Gators football coaches
Boston College Eagles football coaches
Cornell Big Red football coaches
Duke Blue Devils football coaches
Virginia Cavaliers football coaches
VMI Keydets football coaches
Wake Forest Demon Deacons football coaches
High school football coaches in New Jersey
Montclair State University alumni
United States Navy personnel of World War II
United States Navy sailors
Sportspeople from Scranton, Pennsylvania